The R404 is a Regional Route in South Africa that connects George with Herolds Bay. 

On 7 December 2009 an Embraer ERJ 135 aircraft operated by Airlink on a scheduled flight (SA-8625) overrun the runway at George Airport in wet conditions and ended up on the R404.

References

External links
 Routes Travel Info

Regional Routes in the Western Cape